Si Yajie (born 4 December 1998) is a Chinese female diver. As a 14-year-old, she won the gold medal in the women's 10 m platform at the 2013 World Aquatics Championships.

References

External links

Living people
Chinese female divers
1998 births
Asian Games medalists in diving
Divers at the 2014 Asian Games
Divers at the 2018 Asian Games
World Aquatics Championships medalists in diving
Divers at the 2016 Summer Olympics
Olympic divers of China
Olympic medalists in diving
2016 Olympic silver medalists for China
Asian Games gold medalists for China
Medalists at the 2014 Asian Games
Medalists at the 2018 Asian Games
Sportspeople from Xi'an
20th-century Chinese women
21st-century Chinese women